Hans Bocksberger der Ältere (1510–1561), also known as  Hans Bocksberger the Elder, was an Austrian painter and woodcutter of the high Renaissance.

Life 
Hans Bocksberger was born in Mondsee, the son of Ulrich and Anna Bocksberger. The work of his father Ulrich Bocksberger is largely unknown. Hans may have initially studied with his father, then later traveled to Italy where he picked up styles he would later incorporate into his own work. Hans married his wife Margaret in 1542. They had nine children together: sons Hans Bocksberger the Younger and D. J. Heinrich were both painters, in addition to Anna, George, Sabine, Catharina, Elisabeth, Margarethe, Lucia. Hans died in Salzburg in 1561. His wife Margaret died in 1579.

Works 
 frescoes in the Protestant Ducal Palace in Neuburg an der Donau
 frescoes in the Church of St. Jodok, Landshut
Works attributed to Hans Bocksberger, but where there are some questions to authorship:
 frescoes in the Castello del Buonconsiglio in Trento
 paintings in the Knight's Hall in the castle in Goldegg
 works in the Hradčany castle
 altarpieces in the St. Vitus Cathedral
 frescoes in the castle Freisaal
 grotesques in Hohensalzburg Castle

Literature 
 Hans Bocksberger in the Karlsruhe virtual library
 Kaeppele, Susanne:  The Painter Family Bocksberger from Salzburg - Painting Between Reformation and the Italian Renaissance . Salzburg 2003.
 Goering, Max:  The Younger Members of the Painter Family Bocksberger: A Contribution for the History of Mannersism Painting in South Germany . Knorr & Hirth, Munich 1930.

References 
  
 
 short representation
Digitized
 Neuwe liuische figures, inside gantze Roman histories artificially understood and indicated. Franckfurt at the Mayn 1573, online edition of the Saxonian federal state library – state and university library Dresden

16th-century Austrian painters
Austrian male painters
Artists from Salzburg
1510 births
1561 deaths